Essien Etim Moses , NNOM, OFR (31 December 1934 - 12 November 2020) was a Nigerian Professor of Hematology and Chairman of the Governing Board of the Nigerian National Merit Award.
Professor Essien began his career in 1970 at the University College Hospital, Ibadan as a lecturer and Consultant of Hematology. 
In 1977, he became a professor of Hematology in same university.
He is a member of the WHO Expert Panel on Blood and a member of the American Association for the Advancement of Science.

Fellowship
Fellow, Nigerian Academy of Science
Fellow, African Academy of Sciences
Fellow, Royal College of Pathologists

Awards
TWAS Prize (1993)

References

1934 births
2020 deaths
Academic staff of the University of Ibadan
Nigerian hematologists
TWAS laureates
Recipients of the Nigerian National Order of Merit Award
Fellows of the African Academy of Sciences